Félix Salinas (born 11 May 1939) is a Peruvian football defender who played for Peru in the 1970 FIFA World Cup.

Club career
He also played for Universitario de Deportes.

International career
He earned 12 caps for Peru between 1970 and 1972.

References

External links
FIFA profile

1939 births
Living people
Association football defenders
Peruvian footballers
Peru international footballers
1970 FIFA World Cup players
Club Universitario de Deportes footballers